Pas Bagh-e Shamshir (also Romanized as Pas Bāgh-e Shamshīr; also known as Pas Bāgh) is a village in Sar Asiab-e Yusefi Rural District, Bahmai-ye Garmsiri District, Bahmai County, Kohgiluyeh and Boyer-Ahmad Province, Iran. At the 2006 census, its population was 162, in 33 families.

References 

Populated places in Bahmai County